is a city located in Miyagi Prefecture, Japan. , the city had an estimated population of 79,459 in 31,748 households, and a population density of 810 persons per km².

Geography
Natori is in east-central Miyagi Prefecture, bordered by the Pacific Ocean to the east. Natori is located in the fertile plains of the Natori River and the Masuda River deltas; however, the Natori River is actually not inside Natori city limits. Traditionally, the area known as Natori District extended from the Natori River in the north and into the west. However, these regions have been absorbed into the greater Sendai area and are no longer part of Natori.

Neighboring municipalities
Miyagi Prefecture
Sendai
Murata
Iwanuma

Climate
Natori has a humid climate (Köppen climate classification Cfa) characterized by mild summers and cold winters.

Demographics
Per Japanese census data, the population of Natori has increased over the past 40 years.

History
The area of present-day Natori was part of ancient Mutsu Province, and was under control of the Date clan of Sendai Domain during the Edo period, under the Tokugawa shogunate. In 1867, Natori came within the borders of the new Rikuzen Province, which later became part of Miyagi Prefecture. With the establishment of the modern municipalities system on April 1, 1889 Natori District was formed with six villages: Masuda, Higashi-Taga, Shimo-Masuda, Tatekoshi, Aishiwa and Takadate. On April 1, 1896 Masuda was elevated to town status as was Higashi-Taga on April 1, 1928. On April 1, 1955 the towns of Masuda and Yuriage, and the villages of Shimo-Masuda, Tatekoshi, Aishiwa and Takadate were merged to create the town of Natori, which was elevated to city status on October 1, 1958. The official boundaries of Natori City have changed since 1958, as Sendai City redefines its area to include districts to the north and west of Natori.

Damage and casualties from 2011 Tōhoku earthquake and tsunami
The area was badly affected by the 2011 Tōhoku earthquake and tsunami.

Large portions of the coastal area including Sendai Airport was severely damaged by the tsunami.

On March 14, rescue workers arrived in an area of Natori known as Yuriage and found few survivors, as much of the Yuriage area was wiped out. The population had 30 minutes between the earthquake and the tsunami and though many had time to escape city officials initially said it was impossible to determine the number of casualties.

Government
Natori has a mayor-council form of government with a directly elected mayor and a unicameral city legislature of 21 members.  Natori contributes two seats to the Miyagi Prefectural legislature. In terms of national politics, the city is part of Miyagi 3rd district of the lower house of the Diet of Japan.

Economy
Natori has a mixed economy. Based on data collected in 2000:
6.4% of the population of Natori is involved in the primary agricultural and fishing industries.
26.1% of the population of Natori is involved in secondary processing industries, particularly at the Nikon Camera factory and at the Sapporo Breweries factory.

Public facilities

Medical facilities
Natori is home to the Miyagi Prefectural Psychiatric Medical Center and the Prefectural Cancer Center.

Educational and cultural facilities
Natori's educational facilities include a private university (Shokei Gakuin University).

The city has eleven public elementary schools and five public junior high schools operated by the city government and two public high schools operated by the Miyagi Prefectural Board of Education. The prefecture also operates one special education school for the handicapped and two technical schools.

The Natori City Library has a collection of approximately 140,000 books (two books for every person in the city) as of 2002.

The  has a medium-sized hall and rehearsal room, a music room, a cultural centre which includes an exhibition gallery, a professional concert hall and stage, catering facilities and meeting rooms, and other general-purpose facilities for communal use. The structure was designed by Fumihiko Maki and is considered a local attraction.

Additionally, Natori is home to a Media Resource Centre, a community gym, the Miyagi Cycling Centre, and several public beaches and swimming pools.

Transportation

Airport
Sendai Airport

Railway
 East Japan Railway Company (JR East) -  Tōhoku Main Line / Jōban Line
  - 
 East Japan Railway Company (JR East) -  Sendai Airport Line
  -  -  -

Highway
  – Minami-Sendai IC
  – Natori and Sendai Airport IC
  – Yamada IC

Local attractions

Festivals
The Natori Summer Festival is held in early August, and is a town celebration of summer. The celebration is marked by fireworks and traditional Japanese festival foods, such as yakisoba and yakiniku.

The Sapporo Beer Festival is held at the Sapporo Beer Factory. The factory opens to the public for tours of the factory and other events including free beer tasting.

The Donto-sai Festival is held at the height of winter.  Men and women wear only sparse, white clothing and walk silently through the town, receiving sake from local residents along the way.  The event culminates in a communal purification ritual and bonfire at Takekoma Shrine.

Sports
The Natori Sports Park, constructed by Tohoku Electric, is a public area used for various sports meetings and other community events, such as open-air markets.

Historical sites
The Nakazawa Family , ancestral home of the Nakazawa Clan of bushi warriors, has been designated a National Treasure under the Law for the Protection of Cultural Properties. It was constructed in the late 18th century and has an historically important design, including a thatched roof.

The  is a keyhole tumulus constructed sometime circa the 4th and 5th centuries CE, located in an archaeological park. The park contains numerous other tumuli of varying age, both keyhole and circular. It is a National Historic Site.

Natori is home to several sites and artifacts related to Date Masamune, the founder of Sendai Domain. These include 300-year-old pine trees standing by the Natori River dike, which are decorated with paper lanterns and are said to have been planted by Masamune himself.

Other sites
Natori, as a coastal town, has open local fresh fish markets. These markets are open in the port district, every Sunday throughout most of the year.

Specialty products, items and gifts
Because of the Japanese tradition of gift-giving, most cities in Japan have something considered a "local specialty" to be used as omiyage. Natori's main omiyage specialty is kamaboko, a fish paste boiled in bamboo grass. Another local specialty is "beer-tella", a form of castella sponge cake that has been made with brewer's yeast rather than baker's yeast. As one might expect, "beer-tella" smells strongly of beer, and is made at the Sapporo Beer Factory.

Sister city relations
 – Guararapes, Brazil, since March 31, 1979
 – Kaminoyama, Yamagata, Japan since May 10, 1978
 – Shingū, Wakayama, Japan since October 8, 2008

Notable people from Natori, Miyagi
Yudai Tanaka, Japanese football player (Blaublitz Akita, J2 League)
Midori Kuzuoka, Japanese fashion model

References

External links

Official website 

 
Cities in Miyagi Prefecture
Populated coastal places in Japan